Mbinga District is one of the five districts of the Ruvuma Region of Tanzania. It is bordered to the north by the Njombe Region, to the east by Songea Rural District and Songea Urban District, to the south by Mozambique and to the west by Lake Nyasa. Notable people are Oscar Kambona, former minister of foreign affairs. 

According to the 2002 Tanzania National Census, the population of the Mbinga District was 404,799. Mbinga District covers an area of 11,396 square kilometres, about 18 percent of the land area of the Ruvuma Region and about 1% of the land mass of Tanzania.

Wards

The Mbinga District is administratively divided into 37 wards:

 Chiwanda
 Kigonsera
 Kihagara
 Kihangi Mahuka
 Kilimani
 Kilosa
 Kingerikiti
 Kitura
 Langiro
 Liparamba
 Lipingo
 Linda
 Litembo
 Lituhi
 Litumbandyosi
 Liuli
 Maguu
 Matiri
 Mbaha
 Mbamba Bay
 Mbangamao
 Mbinga Urban
 Mbuji
 Mikalanga
 Mkumbi
 Mpapa
 Mpepai
 Mtipwili
 Myangayanga
 Ndongosi
 Ngima
 Ngumbo
 Nyoni
 Ruanda
 Tingi
 Ukata
 Utiri
Kilindi

References 

Districts of Ruvuma Region